The Sneha Shikshana Samsthe Sullia is a group of schools in Sullia town, India. 

It is located on the campus at Snehshila, on right side of Mani-Mysore state highway nearly 1.25 km from Sullia KSRTC bus stand. It established its first school in 1996 and another in 2000.

Curriculum
Classes are offered from pre-kindergarten to Secondary School Leaving Certificate.  The school is maintained under the management of the Sneha Shikshana Samsthe Sullia, which is managed by a group of friends including doctors, academicians and industrialists. Sneha means friendship. The school has 15 teachers and nearly 250 students. Jayalaxmi Damle is the headmistress.

The organization head is academic Chandrashekhara Damle. Correspondent for the institution is Vidyashambhava Pare, surgeon. The directors include Bridge man of India Girish Bharadwaj who recently got a CNN-IBN senior citizen award and K Ananda Kumar, inventor of Concood (a type of concrete that can replace wood) and founder of Master Planer.

The school 7 times secured a 100% result in Secondary School Leaving Certificate exams held by Karnataka State Secondary education Board, Bangalore.

Institutions  

 Sneha Kannada Medium higher primary School
 Sneha English Medium High School

Alumnae 
Sneha Sammilana of Alumnus-2018' a get-together of old students of Nittur Higher Primary School was held at the school campus on Sunday December 23, 2018. The programme was organised by the old students committee.

References 

 The Hindu News Paper
 Deccan Herald News Paper
 Sneha Shiskana Samsthe Sullia

Schools in Dakshina Kannada district